Gavin Kilkenny (born 1 February 2000) is an Irish footballer who plays as a midfielder for League One club Charlton Athletic on loan from AFC Bournemouth.

Club career

Early life
Raised in Beaumont, a suburb of northern Dublin, Kilkenny started out his footballing career at St Kevin's Boys, a schoolboy team with several notable graduates, such as Damien Duff, Jeff Hendrick, Dara O'Shea, Robbie Brady
and Ian Harte. Kilkenny left home at the age of 16 to join AFC Bournemouth, having excelled as a youngster at Gaelic football and hurling.

AFC Bournemouth
Kilkenny joined AFC Bournemouth at the age of sixteen. He moved into the club's under-21 squad after serving a two-year scholarship in the under-18s and was quickly elevated to the first team in the summer of 2019, having signed his first professional contract in April 2018. Kilkenny starred and scored in an impressive 3–0 pre-season friendly win over Lyon, being named man of the match. He made his debut for the club starting in a 0–0 draw against Forest Green Rovers in the EFL Cup on 28 August 2019. He then appeared in the following round, starting in a 2–0 away loss to Burton Albion.

Stoke City (loan)
On 2 July 2022, Kilkenny joined Stoke City on loan for the 2022–23 season.

Charlton Athletic (loan)
On 31 January 2023, Kilkenny joined Charlton Athletic on loan for the rest of the 2022–23 season.

International career
Kilkenny is a youth international for the Republic of Ireland, having experience playing in the U18s squads and the U21s.

Career statistics

Honours
AFC Bournemouth
Championship runner-up: 2021–22

References

2000 births
Living people
Association footballers from Dublin (city)
Republic of Ireland association footballers
Association football midfielders
AFC Bournemouth players
Stoke City F.C. players
Charlton Athletic F.C. players
English Football League players
Irish expatriate sportspeople in England
Expatriate footballers in England
People educated at St Aidan's C.B.S.
St. Kevin's Boys F.C. players